Globdule is a 1993 video game from Psygnosis.

Development
The game was first mentioned in November 1992. The title was slated to release for Sega Genesis in Autumn 1994 but never did.

Reception

Kingston Informer gave the game a score of 2 out of 5 stating "This is definitely a game for the younger player,a competent but annoyingly fiddly offering from Psygnosis. If you want to buy one of its games, go for Wiz 'n' Liz, a far superior product."

References

1993 video games
Cancelled Sega Genesis games
Psygnosis games
Amiga games
Amiga-only games